The Little Smoky River is a tributary of the Smoky River in west-central Alberta, Canada.

Course

The river originates in the foothills of the Canadian Rockies, west of Grande Cache and flows in a north-east direction throughout the foothills. Upon reaching the open prairie, it meanders northwards and merges into the Smoky River south of the town of Watino. From here, its waters are carried to the Arctic Ocean through the Peace, Slave and Mackenzie Rivers.

The Little Smoky River has an average discharge of 25 m³/s, and can reach over 100 m³/s in spring.

The towns of Valleyview and Little Smoky are located in the Little Smoky River basin.

Tributaries
Joachim Creek
David Creek
Rocky Creek
Kiskiu Creek
Smoky Lake
Tony Creek
Iosegun River
Waskahigan River
Asplund Creek
Goose River
Sweathouse Creek
Sturgeon Creek (from Sturgeon Lake)
Boulder Creek
Snipe Creek (from Snipe Lake)
Deep Creek
Stony Creek
Crazy Man Creek
Bartsch Creek
Nicholls Creek
Mcleans Creek
Gunns Creek
Wabatanisk Creek
Peavine Creek
Whitemud Creek
Shufflemire Creek

See also
Geography of Alberta
List of Alberta rivers

References

Rivers of Alberta